Susan Solomon (born January 19, 1956 in Chicago) is an American atmospheric chemist, working for most of her career at the National Oceanic and Atmospheric Administration. In 2011, Solomon joined the faculty at the Massachusetts Institute of Technology, where she serves as the Ellen Swallow Richards Professor of Atmospheric Chemistry & Climate Science. Solomon, with her colleagues, was the first to propose the chlorofluorocarbon free radical reaction mechanism that is the cause of the Antarctic ozone hole.

Solomon is a member of the U.S. National Academy of Sciences, the European Academy of Sciences, and the French Academy of Sciences.
In 2002, Discover magazine recognized her  as one of the 50 most important women in science.
In 2008, Solomon was selected by Time magazine as one of the 100 most influential people in the world. She also serves on the Science and Security Board for the Bulletin of the Atomic Scientists.

Biography

Early life
Solomon's interest in science began as a child watching The Undersea World of Jacques Cousteau. In high school she placed third in a national science competition, with a project that measured the percent of oxygen in a gas mixture.

Solomon received a bachelor's degree in chemistry from Illinois Institute of Technology in 1977. She received her Ph.D. in chemistry from the University of California, Berkeley in 1981, where she specialized in atmospheric chemistry.

Personal life
Solomon married Barry Sidwell in 1988. She is Jewish.

Work
Solomon was the head of the Chemistry and Climate Processes Group of the National Oceanic and Atmospheric Administration Chemical Sciences Division until 2011. In 2011, she joined the faculty of the Department of Earth, Atmospheric and Planetary Sciences at the Massachusetts Institute of Technology.

Books
 The Coldest March: Scott's Fatal Antarctic Expedition, Yale University Press, 2002  – Depicts the tale of Captain Robert Falcon Scott's failed 1912 Antarctic expedition, specifically applying the comparison of modern meteorological data with that recorded by Scott's expedition in an attempt to shed new light on the reasons for the demise of Scott's polar party.
 Aeronomy of the Middle Atmosphere: Chemistry and Physics of the Stratosphere and Mesosphere, 3rd Edition, Springer, 2005  – Describes the atmospheric chemistry and physics of the middle atmosphere from  altitude.

The Ozone Hole

Solomon, working with colleagues at the NOAA Earth System Research Laboratory, postulated the mechanism that the Antarctic ozone hole was created by a heterogeneous reaction of ozone and chlorofluorocarbons free radicals on the surface of ice particles in the high altitude clouds that form over Antarctica. In 1986 and 1987 Solomon led the National Ozone Expedition to McMurdo Sound, where the team gathered the evidence to confirm the accelerated reactions. Solomon was the solo leader of the expedition, and the only woman on the team. Her team measured levels of chlorine oxide 100 times higher than expected in the atmosphere, which had been released by the decomposition of chlorofluorocarbons by ultraviolet radiation.

Solomon later showed that volcanoes could accelerate the reactions caused by chlorofluorocarbons, and so increase the damage to the ozone layer. Her work formed the basis of the U.N. Montreal Protocol, an international agreement to protect the ozone layer by regulating damaging chemicals. Solomon has also presented some research which suggests that implementation of the Montreal Protocols is having a positive effect.

Using research work conducted by English explorer and navy officer Robert Falcon Scott, Solomon also wrote and spoke about Scott's 1911 expedition in The Coldest March: Scott's Fatal Antarctic Expedition to counter a longstanding argument that blamed Scott for his and his crew's demise during that expedition. Scott attributed his death to unforeseen weather conditions – a claim that has been contested by British journalist and author Roland Huntford. Huntford claimed that Scott was a prideful and under-prepared leader. Solomon has defended  Scott and said that "modern data side squarely with Scott", describing the weather conditions in 1911 as unusual.

For her critical contribution to saving the ozone layer, Solomon was a winner of the 2021 Future of Life Award along with Joe Farman and Stephen O. Andersen. Dr. Jim Hansen, former Director of the NASA Goddard Institute for Space Studies and Director of Columbia University's Program on Climate Science, Awareness and Solutions said, "In Farman, Solomon and Andersen we see the tremendous impact individuals can have not only on the course of human history, but on the course of our planet's history. My hope is that others like them will emerge in today's battle against climate change." Professor Guus Velders, a climate scientist at Utrecht University said, "Susan Solomon is a deserving recipient of the Future of Life Award. Susan not only explained the processes behind the formation of the ozone hole, she also played an active role as an interface between the science and policy of the Montreal Protocol."

Intergovernmental Panel on Climate Change
Solomon served on the Intergovernmental Panel on Climate Change. She was a contributing author for the Third Assessment Report. She was also co-chair of Working Group I for the Fourth Assessment Report.

Awards
 1991 – Henry G. Houghton Award for research in physical meteorology, awarded by the American Meteorological Society
 1994 – Solomon Saddle, a snow saddle at about  elevation, named in her honor
 1994 – Solomon Glacier, an Antarctic glacier named in her honor
 1999 – National Medal of Science, awarded by the President of the United States
 2000 – Carl-Gustaf Rossby Research Medal, awarded by the American Meteorological Society
 2004 – Blue Planet Prize,  awarded by the Asahi Glass Foundation
 2006 – V. M. Goldschmidt Award
 2006 – Inducted into the Colorado Women's Hall of Fame
 2007 – William Bowie Medal, awarded by the American Geophysical Union
 2007 – As a member of IPCC, which received half of the Nobel Peace Prize in 2007, she shared a stage receiving the prize with Al Gore (who received the other half).
 2008 – Grande Médaille (Great Medal) of the French Academy of Sciences
 2008 – Foreign Member of the Royal Society
2008 – Member of the American Philosophical Society
 2009 – Volvo Environment Prize, awarded by the Royal Swedish Academy of Sciences
 2009 – Inducted into the National Women's Hall of Fame
 2010 – Service to America Medal, awarded by the Partnership for Public Service
 2012 – Vetlesen Prize, for work on the ozone hole, shared with Jean Jouzel. She was the first woman to receive this prize.
 2013 – BBVA Foundation Frontiers of Knowledge Award in the Climate Change category
 2015 – Honorary Doctorate (honoris causa) from Brown University.
 2017 – Arthur L. Day Prize and Lectureship by the National Academy of Sciences for substantive work in atmospheric chemistry and climate change
 2018 – Bakerian Lecture
 2018 – Crafoord Prize in Geosciences
 2019 – Made one of the members of the inaugural class of the Government Hall of Fame
2021 – On 31 July she was appointed as ordinary Member of the Pontifical Academy of Sciences
2021 –  2021 Future of Life Award (Ozone Layer)

References

External links
 Oral History Interview with Susan Solomon. (1997-09-05). American Meteorological Society Oral History Project. UCAR Archives.
 

1956 births
Living people
American geophysicists
Atmospheric chemists
American women chemists
Illinois Institute of Technology alumni
UC Berkeley College of Chemistry alumni
Carl-Gustaf Rossby Research Medal recipients
Members of the French Academy of Sciences
Foreign Members of the Royal Society
Members of the United States National Academy of Sciences
National Oceanic and Atmospheric Administration personnel
National Medal of Science laureates
20th-century American women scientists
21st-century American women scientists
Women geophysicists
20th-century American chemists
21st-century American scientists
Members of Academia Europaea
Intergovernmental Panel on Climate Change contributing authors
Marine geophysicists
Recipients of the V. M. Goldschmidt Award